This is a list of cafeterias. A cafeteria is a type of food service location in which there is little or no waiting staff table service, whether a restaurant or within an institution such as a large office building or school; a school dining location is also referred to as a dining hall or canteen (in the UK, Ireland and some Commonwealth countries). Cafeterias are different from coffeehouses, although that is the Spanish meaning of the English word.

Cafeterias

  Bar mleczny 
  Bickford's (restaurant)
  Britling Cafeterias 
  Clifton's Cafeteria
  Dubrow's Cafeteria 
  Forum Cafeterias 
  K&W Cafeterias 
  Laughner's Cafeteria 
  Luby's 
  Manning's Cafeterias 
  MCL Cafeterias 
  Morrison's Cafeteria 
  Mr. Fables 
  Piccadilly Restaurants 
  Sholl's Colonial Cafeteria 
  Yesterdog

See also

 Automat
 Food court
 Hawker centre
 List of buffet restaurants
 Lists of restaurants
 Types of restaurant

References

External links
 

 
Lists of restaurants